The Cumbernauld Line is a suburban railway line linking Glasgow to Falkirk via Cumbernauld in Scotland. Since May 2014, the newly electrified track between Springburn and Cumbernauld has become an extension of the North Clyde network.

Services
All passenger services on this Line are operated by ScotRail.

Following electrification between June 2013 and May 2014, Cumbernauld services became an extension of the North Clyde Line's Springburn Branch. Services from Cumbernauld arrived at Glasgow Queen Street Low Level platforms, freeing up capacity in the High Level station. Due to cancellation of the Garngad Chord, trains must reverse from Springburn.

As of 2019, the existing Falkirk Grahamston service has been extended through to Edinburgh Waverley. All services to Cumbernauld have also been extended with services now departing from Glasgow Queen Street High Level instead of Low Level. All services now use Class 385 EMUs instead of diesel units.

Future developments
Upon completion of the Edinburgh to Glasgow Improvement Programme, a series of Diversionary Route electrification projects have been outlined for completion in 2018. These plans include full electrification between Cumbernauld and Falkirk Grahamston.

With the cancellation of the Garngad Chord in November 2011, the potential to remove the timely reversing procedure at Springburn is still an option.

There are also tentative plans to extend passenger services from Falkirk to Grangemouth, a town which lost its train service in January 1968. This is an idea put forward by Network Rail to improve freight access and is supported by Falkirk Council, who are currently undertaking a feasibility study into the project's potential.

References

Notes

Sources
 

Transport in Glasgow
Railway lines in Scotland
Standard gauge railways in Scotland